Arvo Haug (born 14 May 1938 Tallinn) is an Estonian politician. He was a member of VII Riigikogu.

References

Living people
1938 births
Members of the Riigikogu, 1992–1995
Members of the Riigikogu, 1995–1999
Members of the Riigikogu, 1999–2003